Mohammad Jani (also Romanized as Moḩammad Jānī and Moḩammadjānī) is a village in Garizat Rural District, Nir District, Taft County, Yazd Province, Iran. As of the 2006 census, its population was 15, in 6 families.

References 

Populated places in Taft County